China Fire and Rescue Force is the state emergency service force for firefighting and rescue in China, which is part of the civil service and administrated by the Ministry of Emergency Management (MEM).

China Fire and Rescue Force is divided into two departments: fire and rescue and forestry fire. Its predecessors were the fire department of the Ministry of Public Security and People's Armed Police forestry troops. The Fire and Rescue Department of MEM and the forestry fire department of MEM are the leading and commanding organs of the fire and rescue force and the forestry fire force respectively. China Fire and Rescue Force is responsible for preventing and resolving major safety risks, dealing with all kinds of disasters and accidents, and undertaking relevant functions of national fire prevention and emergency rescue due to law.

History 
On March 17, 2018, the first meeting of the 13th National People's Congress adopted The Decision of the First Session of the 13th National People's Congress on the Institutional Reform Program of the State Council, approving The Institutional Reform Program of the State Council. The program provides that "the Ministry of Emergency Management is formed. The duty of the State Administration of Work Safety, the emergency management duty of the General Office of the State Council, the fire management duty of the Ministry of Public Security, the disaster relief duty of the Ministry of Civil Affairs, the geological disaster prevention and control duty of the Ministry of Land and Resources, the water and drought prevention and control duty of the Ministry of Water Resources, the grassland fire prevention duty of the Ministry of Agriculture, the forest fire prevention-related duty of the State Forestry Administration, the earthquake emergency rescue duty of the China Earthquake Administration and the general headquarters of the National Flood and Drought Control, the National Disaster Reduction Committee, the State Council earthquake relief command, the National Forest Fire Prevention Command, the integration of duty to form the Ministry of Emergency Management, as the State Council departments. The China Earthquake Administration and the National Coal Mine Safety Supervision Department are managed by the Ministry of Emergency Management. After the conversion of public security fire forces, armed police forestry troops, and safety production, and other emergency rescue teams together as a comprehensive standing emergency force, managed by the Ministry of Emergency Management. No longer retain the State Administration of Work Safety."

On November 9, the Great Hall of the people held a national comprehensive fire rescue team flag ceremony. Wang Huning, member of the Chinese Communist Party (CCP) Politburo Standing Committee, Secretary of the Central Secretariat, read The Decision of the CPC Central Committee, the State Council on the award of the flag to the national comprehensive fire rescue force - China Fire and Rescue Force. Xi Jinping, the Central Committee General Secretary of CPC, President of China, and Chairman of the Central Military Commission, handed the flag of China Fire and Rescue Force to the secretary of the Party in MEM, vice minister, Fire and rescue commissioner Huang Ming.

Duty 

As per articles 37, 38, and 42 of "The Fire Control Law of the People's Republic of China", the national comprehensive fire rescue team and full-time fire brigade shall undertake the following duties:

 The national comprehensive fire and rescue team and full-time fire brigade shall, in accordance with the provisions of the state, undertake major disasters and accidents and other emergency rescue work focusing on saving the lives of personnel.
 The national comprehensive fire and rescue team and full-time fire brigade shall give full play to the backbone role of fire fighting and emergency rescue professional force, organize and implement professional skill training, equip and maintain equipment and equipment, and improve the ability of fire fighting and emergency rescue in accordance with national regulations.
 The fire rescue organization shall provide professional guidance to the full-time fire brigade, voluntary fire brigade, and other fire control organizations; according to the needs of fire fighting, it may mobilize and direct the full-time fire brigade to participate in the fire fighting work.

Organization

Fire and rescue contingents 

According to the organization's establishment plan of fire and rescue contingents headquarters, there are 34 units under the Fire and Rescue Department of MEM (including 31 provincial fire and rescue contingents and 3 training contingents). The specific composition is as follows:

Forestry fire contingents 

According to the organization establishment plan of forestry fire brigade headquarters, there are 9 units under the Forest Fire Bureau of emergency management department (including 9 provincial forest fire contingents), and the specific composition is as follows:

Others

Rank and uniform

Plate and painting 

The front part of the professional fire rescue vehicle body is painted with the words "RESCUE", the side of the vehicle body is painted with the words "China Fire and Rescue Force", "FIRE" and the name and vehicle number of the affiliated unit, the roof is painted with the vehicle number, and the decorative strips are painted on both sides of the vehicle body and the rear of the vehicle.

References

External links 
 应急管理部消防救援局
 中国消防在线
 中国森林防火网

See also 
 Ministry of Emergency Management
 People's Armed Police
 National Fire Agency

2018 establishments in China
Firefighting in China
Fire departments